Melvyn Kenneth Smith (3 December 1952 – 19 July 2013) was an English comedian, actor and director. Smith worked on the sketch comedy shows Not the Nine O'Clock News and Alas Smith and Jones with his comedy partner, Griff Rhys Jones. Smith and Jones founded Talkback, which grew to be one of the United Kingdom's largest producers of television comedy and light entertainment programming.

Early life 
Smith's father, Kenneth, was born in Tow Law, County Durham, and worked at a coal mine during the Second World War; looking after the pit ponies. After the war ended, he moved to London and married Smith's mother, whose parents owned a greengrocers in Chiswick. When the government legalised high street betting with the Betting and Gaming Act 1960, he turned the shop into the first betting shop in Chiswick.

Smith was born and brought up in Chiswick. He was educated at Hogarth Primary School, Chiswick, and at Latymer Upper School, a private school in Hammersmith. He studied Experimental Psychology at New College, Oxford.

Career
Whilst at Oxford University, Smith produced The Tempest, and performed at the Edinburgh Fringe with the Oxford University Dramatic Society. One year they shared a venue with the Cambridge Footlights, directed by John Lloyd. His extra-curricular activities while at university led to his joining the Royal Court Theatre production team in London, and then Bristol Old Vic. He was also associate director of Sheffield's Crucible Theatre for two years. Later, he directed a theatre production of Not in Front of the Audience.

John Lloyd later gained the opportunity to develop the idea that became the satirical BBC television series Not the Nine O'Clock News. This was followed briefly by Smith and Goody (with Bob Goody) and then the comedy sketch series Alas Smith and Jones, co-starring Griff Rhys Jones, its title being a pun on the name of the American television series Alias Smith and Jones. In 1982, he starred as the lead role in ITV drama Muck and Brass where he played Tom Craig, a ruthless property developer. In 1984, he appeared in the Minder episode "A Star Is Gorn" playing the character Cyril Ash, a record producer. He also guest-starred on The Goodies episode "Animals". At the end of the 1980s, he played the title role in the sitcom Colin's Sandwich (1988–90), playing a British Rail employee with aspirations to be a writer.

In 1981, Smith and Griff Rhys Jones founded TalkBack Productions, a company that produced many of the most significant British comedy shows of the following decades, including Smack the Pony, Da Ali G Show, I'm Alan Partridge and Big Train. In 2000, the company was sold to Pearson for £62 million. Dressed as bobbies, Smith and Jones introduced Queen on stage at Live Aid in July 1985, with Smith removing his helmet before shouting into the microphone, "her majesty, Queen!"

Smith co-wrote and took the lead role in the space comedy Morons from Outer Space (1985), but the film failed to make much impact. His next cinema effort was better received as director of The Tall Guy (1989), giving Emma Thompson a major screen role. Perhaps his best-known film in America is Brain Donors, the 1992 update of the Marx Brothers film A Night at the Opera, starring Smith as a cheeky, opportunistic cab driver turned ballet promoter. Paramount Pictures considered this film the outstanding comedy of the year, but when the producers left Paramount for another studio, Paramount withdrew its support for the film.

In 1987, Smith recorded a single with Kim Wilde for Comic Relief: a cover of the Christmas song "Rockin' Around the Christmas Tree" with some additional comedy lines written by Smith and Jones. The pairing of Smith and Wilde was a comic allusion to the duo Mel and Kim. The song reached number three in the UK charts. The same year he appeared in The Princess Bride as the Albino.

Smith and Jones were reunited in 2005 for a review/revival of their earlier television series in The Smith And Jones Sketchbook. Smith joked: "Obviously, Griff's got more money than me so he came to work in a Rolls-Royce and I came on a bicycle. But it was great fun to do and we are firmly committed to doing something new together, because you don't chuck that sort of chemistry away. Of course, I'll have to pretend I like Restoration."

In August 2006, Smith returned to the theatre stage after some 20 years, appearing at the Edinburgh Fringe festival in Allegiance, Irish journalist and author Mary Kenny's play about Churchill's encounter with the Irish nationalist leader Michael Collins in 1921. The play initially caused some controversy, with Smith proposing to flout the Scottish ban on smoking in public places, but the scene was quickly adapted after gaining the required amount of publicity. The play was directed by Brian Gilbert and produced by Daniel Jewel. In 2006, he also appeared in Hustle as Benjamin Frasier, a pub landlord who was scammed by the Hustle team when his on-screen son Joey tried to launch a rap career.

In autumn 2006, Smith starred opposite Belinda Lang in a tour of a new comedy An Hour and a Half Late by French playwright Gérald Sibleyras, which was adapted by Smith. He then directed a West End revival of Charley's Aunt starring Stephen Tompkinson. From October 2007 to January 2008, he played the role of Wilbur Turnblad in the London production of Hairspray at the Shaftesbury Theatre.

Personal life
Smith was married to Pamela (née Gay-Rees), a former model, who grew up in Easington and Durham. The couple had houses in St John's Wood, London, and the hamlet of Great Haseley, Oxfordshire, as well as a property in Barbados.

Health
Smith was hospitalised in 1999 with stomach ulcers, following an accidental overdose of over 50 Nurofen Plus tablets in one day, after previously admitting an addiction to sleeping pills. Smith said at the time that the pressures of film work were a contributing factor, along with a desperate need to ease the pain caused by gout. Partly as a result, he agreed to sell Talkback Productions.  On 31 December 2008, Smith appeared on Celebrity Mastermind whilst suffering from severe pharyngitis.

Death
On the morning of 19 July 2013, the London Ambulance Service was called to Smith's home in north-west London. Smith was confirmed dead by the ambulance crew, with a later post-mortem confirming death from a heart attack.

Television shows

Producer
 2000 Too Much Sun television series, six episodes
 1995 Tough Target television series, one episode

Director
 1994 Dream On, one episode

Performer
 1979–1982 Not the Nine O'Clock News
 1980 Smith and Goody
 1981 Fundamental Frolics
 1982–1998 Alas Smith and Jones/Smith and Jones
 1982 Muck and Brass
 1984 Weekend in Wallop
 1984 The Young Ones
 1985 Live Aid (comedy sketch and intro to rock band Queen)
 1986 Comedians Do It on Stage
 1987 The World According to Smith and Jones
 1987 Filthy Rich & Catflap
 1987 The Grand Knockout Tournament
 1988–1990 Colin's Sandwich
 1989 Smith and Jones in Small Doses
 1991 Amnesty International's Big 30
 1991 Comic Relief
 1995 The Night of Comic Relief
 1996 A Gala Comedy Hour (Best of the Prince's Trust)
 2005 Comic Relief 2005
 2006 The Smith and Jones Sketchbook
 2006 The Sittaford Mystery, an episode of Marple
 2006 Hustle
 2008 Celebrity Mastermind
 2010–2011 Rock & Chips (two episode)
 2012 The Ones: Series 1: The One Griff Rhys Jones
 2013 Dancing on the Edge

Writer 
 1979-1982 Not the Nine O'Clock News
 1980 Smith and Goody
 1984 Alas Smith and Jones, two episodes
 1984 Weekend in Wallop
 1986 Comedians Do It on Stage
 1991 Amnesty International's Big 30
 1994 Smith and Jones: One Night Stand
 1996 A Gala Comedy Hour (Best of the Prince's Trust)

Filmography

Executive producer 
 2003 Blackball

Director
 1989 The Tall Guy
 1994 Radioland Murders
 1997 Bean
 2001 High Heels and Low Lifes
 2003 Blackball

Writer 
 1985 Morons from Outer Space co-written with Griff Rhys Jones

Actor 

 1980 Bloody Kids as Disco Doorman
 1980 Babylon as Alan
 1983 Bullshot as Crouch
 1983 Slayground as Terry Abbatt
 1984 Minder as Cyril Ash
 1985 Restless Natives as Pyle
 1985 Morons from Outer Space as Bernard 
 1985 National Lampoon's European Vacation as London Hotel Receptionist
 1987 The Princess Bride as The Albino
 1988 The Wolves of Willoughby Chase as Mr. Grimshaw
 1989 Wilt as Inspector Flint
 1991 Father Christmas as Father Christmas
 1992 Brain Donors (aka Lame Ducks) as Rocco Melonchek
 1994 Art Deco Detective as Porno Movie Director 
 1996 Twelfth Night: Or What You Will as Sir Toby Belch

References

External links
 
 Rockin' around the Christmas tree at kimwildetv.com.

1952 births
2013 deaths
20th-century English male actors
20th-century English writers
21st-century English male actors
21st-century English writers
Alumni of New College, Oxford
British male television writers
Businesspeople from London
Comedians from London
Comedy film directors
English comedy writers
English company founders
English film producers
English male comedians
English male film actors
English male musical theatre actors
English male Shakespearean actors
English male stage actors
English male television actors
English male voice actors
English television producers
English television writers
English theatre directors
Film directors from London
Male actors from London
People educated at Latymer Upper School
People from Chiswick
People from St John's Wood
Television personalities from London
Writers from London
20th-century English businesspeople